Josh White Jr. is a Grammy Award-nominated recording artist who upholds the musical traditions of his father, the late bluesman Josh White.

Career
At the age of four, Josh White Jr. made his professional debut alongside his father at the Café Society in New York City. In 1949, he co-starred with the elder White on Broadway in "How Long Til Summer?" For his work on the show, Josh White Jr. received a special Tony Award.

In 1956, Josh White Jr. made his solo recording debut on Decca with "See Saw," co-written with Marvin Hamlisch. Hamlisch was a classmate of White's at the Professional Children's School along with Christopher Walken, Sandra Dee, Leslie Uggams, and Elliott Gould.

In the 1960s, White became a popular attraction in the college tour circuit, while continuing to record.

In 1979, he headlined at concert special for PBS and starred in a stage biography of his father a few years later.

He received a Grammy nomination in 1987 for Jazz, Ballads and Blues, another tribute to his father.

White continues to record. His album, Tuning for the Blues, is a collection of folk tunes which was released in 2011.

References

1940 births
Decca Records artists
American blues musicians
American folk musicians
Living people
Singers from New York (state)